A constitutional referendum was held in Algeria on 3 November 1988. The changes were put forward by the government, and constituted amendments to fourteen articles (intended to reduce the power of the ruling party, the National Liberation Front). However, the changes were opposed by opposition leaders, who claimed the changes needed to go further in the direction of political pluralism, and called on the public to boycott the vote. Nevertheless, the amendments were approved by 92.3% voters with an 83% turnout.

Results

References

1988 in Algeria
1988 referendums
Constitutional referendums in Algeria